John Letcher (born 26 November 1950) is a former Australian rules footballer who played with Melbourne in the Victorian Football League (VFL).

Notes

External links 

1950 births
Living people
Australian rules footballers from Victoria (Australia)
Melbourne Football Club players